Carl Larsen (1886–1962) was a Danish gymnast.

Carl Larsen may also refer to:
 
Carl Anton Larsen (1860–1924), Norwegian Antarctic explorer
Emanuel Larsen (Carl Frederik Emanuel Larsen, 1823–1859), Danish painter
Carl G. Larsen (1844–1928), Danish emigrant to San Francisco and Larsen Park donor
Carl Larsen (footballer)

See also
Carl Larson (disambiguation)
Carl Larsson (1853–1919), Swedish painter and interior designer
Karl Larsen (disambiguation)
Karl Larsson (disambiguation)